Smokey Mountain was the term coined for a large landfill once located in Tondo, Manila.

History 
Smokey Mountain operated for more than 50 years, consisting of over two million metric tons of waste. The flammable substances on decomposing waste led to fires which has resulted in many deaths.

On March 19, 1993, a joint venture agreement, between the National Housing Authority (NHA) and R-II Builders Inc. (RBI) was made to build a low-cost housing project at Smokey Mountain. On 15 August 2007, this agreement was declared valid by the Philippine Supreme Court. The area was officially closed in 1995. The site was turned into public housing for the impoverished people living in the slums surrounding the landfill. The slums were also cleared, which was the home of 30,000 people that make their living from picking through the landfill's rubbish.

In the 1990s Jane Walker arrived in the Philippines on holiday and her taxi took her by Smokey Mountain. She was intrigued by the Tondo slums and she returned back to Southampton where her plan to do something took place. In time she would raise money, raise funds and build businesses that transformed rubbish into products like handbags. She was awarded an MBE in 2006 and in 2012 she was living in the Philippines.

Projects have been enforced by the government and non-government organizations to allow urban resettlement sites for the slum dwellers. According to a UN-Habitat report, over 20 million people in the Philippines live in slums, and in the city of Manila alone, 50% of the over 11 million inhabitants live in slum areas.

Migration to The Payatas Dump 

When Smokey Mountain closed down in 1995, many scavengers migrated to the Payatas dumpsite, where another large scavenging community arose. In 2000, a landslide at the Payatas dump killed over two hundred scavengers. As of 2007, approximately 80,000 people live at the Payatas dump.

In culture 
National Artist for Music Ryan Cayabyab formed the singing group Smokey Mountain in 1989, named after the garbage dump. The band performed songs that tackled socially relevant themes such as poverty, children’s rights, environmentalism, and overseas Filipino workers.

National Artist for Film Lino Brocka set some of his movies in the slums of Tondo. Smokey Mountain features prominently as the setting for the 1987 film Pasan Ko ang Daigdig starring Sharon Cuneta.

Smokey Mountain was part of a walking tour organized by Smokey Tours, a private organization that donated its profits to impoverished communities through livelihood and environmental projects. Tours at Smokey Mountain ended in 2014 and new tours were held at the Happyland slum area in Tondo and Baseco Compound.

See also
 Environment of the Philippines
 Poverty in the Philippines
 Squatting in the Philippines

References

Landfills in the Philippines
Slums in the Philippines
Environmental issues in the Philippines
Geography of Manila
Tondo, Manila
Former squats
Squatting in the Philippines